Kol BaRama is a Haredi Israeli radio station established in 2009. The station, based in Bnei Brak, broadcasts seven days a week, but not on Shabbat (from nightfall Saturday night until sunset Friday afternoon)

Frequencies

Political Identification
The station is now closely identified with Aryeh Deri's Shas party. But from 2005 until 2010 the party supported Shas rival Eli Yishay.

COVID-19 Broadcasts
During the 2020 COVID-19 virus pandemic, when all synagogues in Israel were shut the station received permission to broadcast daily prayers with a minyan 3 times a day.

External links
Official website (Listen live)

Haredi Judaism in Israel
Mass media in Bnei Brak
Radio stations in Israel
2009 establishments in Israel
Religious mass media in Israel